Gabriel Braga Nunes (born February 7, 1972) is a Brazilian actor, best known for his work in telenovelas, specially Essas Mulheres, Cidadão Brasileiro, Caminhos do Coração and Poder Paralelo. He also stars in Insensato Coração for TV Globo.

Career 
Graduate in Theatre Arts from University of Campinas, made his television debut in 1996, playing Mário on the telenovela Razão de Viver, aired on SBT. In 1997, he played a photographer in the miniseries Por Amor e Ódio, at Rede Record. After that, he worked in several of the Rede Globo soap operas such as O Beijo do Vampiro, Terra Nostra and Anjo Mau.

In 2006, he returned to Rede Record. After the successful telenovela Essas Mulheres, in which he played Fernando Seixas, Braga Nunes starred Cidadão Brasileiro as Antonio Maciel. In 2009, Gabriel Braga Nunes protagonist of the telenovela Poder Paralelo with the character Antonio Castellamare, with actress Paloma Duarte. After participating in five soap operas in five years, Braga Nunes decided to take a "vacation" of television.

In late 2010, however, the actor has been invited to join the miniseries As Cariocas, the chapter "A Atormentada da Tijuca", played by Paola Oliveira. This was his first return to work globo

Gabriel played the villain Léo in the telenovela Insensato Coração. After the close of this novel, he closed his 4-year contract with Globo.

In 2011, he worked in the stage play Caminhos da Independência, playing Dom Pedro I. In 2013, he was cast to play the mysterious Teacher Aristóbulo in Saramandaia.

In 2014, Braga Nunes lives Laerte, the central character in the third stage of the telenovela Em Família. In the same year, it is reserved for the new telenovela of Gilberto Braga, Babilônia.

Personal life 
Gabriel is the son of actress Regina Braga and director Celso Nunes.

Gabriel Braga Nunes had a relationship with actress and singer Danni Carlos for about three years. In mid-2005, the couple began living together, being separated in 2007. In 2009, during the filming of the soap opera Poder Paralelo, Braga Nunes became involved with co-star Paloma Duarte.

In April 2014, he married the assistant director, Isabel Nascimento Silva. In June of the same year, his first daughter, Maria, was born.

Filmography

Television

Film

References

External links 

1972 births
Living people
Male actors from São Paulo
Brazilian male film actors
Brazilian male telenovela actors
State University of Campinas alumni
20th-century Brazilian male actors
21st-century Brazilian male actors